The Confederación Sudamericana de Rugby (CONSUR) Championship C Division Championship took place between 1–7 December 2013 at Colegio Franco Costarricense in San Jose, Costa Rica.  This was the second time CONSUR has run a 3rd division championship.

Costa Rica hosted Guatemala, Ecuador and El Salvador, with the tournament played over three game days.  The tournament was conducted as a single round robin tournament.

Panama and Nicaragua will play a friendly international game.

2013 CONSUR C Championship

Match Schedule

Friendly International

Related Page 
 2013 South American Rugby Championship "A"
 2013 South American Rugby Championship "B"

References 

2013
2013 rugby union tournaments for national teams
C
rugby union
rugby union
rugby union
rugby union
International rugby union competitions hosted by Costa Rica